Chertkovo is a rural locality (a village) and the administrative center of Chertkovskoye Rural Settlement, Selivanovsky District, Vladimir Oblast, Russia. The population was 295 as of 2010. There are 3 streets.

Geography 
Chertkovo is located 24 km northeast of Krasnaya Gorbatka (the district's administrative centre) by road. Kurkovo is the nearest rural locality.

References 

Rural localities in Selivanovsky District
Vyaznikovsky Uyezd